As If is an American comedy-drama adapted from the British television series of the same name which aired on UPN  on March 5 to March 22, 2002. It served as a midseason replacement for Roswell and aired on Tuesdays on UPN after Buffy the Vampire Slayer. The cast included Emily Corrie, who portrayed Sooz in the original UK version.

Synopsis
The series focused on six friends in Los Angeles, with full episodes shot entirely from one perspective. Each episode presented different modern topics that applied to many teens of the day.

Cancellation
The series was a part of the network's Tuesday evening 9 p.m. ET/PT timeslot, which outside of a couple exceptions, was terminally troubled due to The WB and Fox's much better ratings on the evening.

Cast
 Tracie Thoms as Sasha
 Derek Hughes as Jamie
 Adrienne Wilkinson as Nikki
 Robin Dunne as Alex
 Emily Corrie as Sooz
 Chris Engen as Rob

Episodes

References

External links
 
 

UPN original programming
2002 American television series debuts
2002 American television series endings
2000s American comedy-drama television series
2000s American LGBT-related comedy television series
2000s American LGBT-related drama television series
2000s American teen drama television series
American television series based on British television series
Television series by Sony Pictures Television
English-language television shows